Mira lo que has hecho is a Spanish comedy television series created by Berto Romero that originally aired from 2018 to 2020 on Movistar+. It stars Berto Romero and Eva Ugarte.

Premise 
The fiction, focused on the couple formed by Berto—a comedian and host—and Sandra—an anaesthesiologist doctor—, starts with the arrival of their first child.

Cast 
 Berto Romero as Berto.
  as Sandra.
 Carmen Esteban as Angela.
 Inma Sancho as Olga.
 Chete Lera as Ramón.
 Anna Carreño as Rosa.
 Mariano Venancio as Julio.
 Jordi Aguilar as Jose.
 
Introduced in season 2
 Belén Cuesta
 Núria Gago

Production and release 
Created by Berto Romero, the series was written by the former together with Rafel Barceló and Enric Pardo. Season 1 was directed by  whereas seasons 2 and 3 were directed by Javier Ruiz Caldera. Filming locations included a number of places in Catalonia. The series premiered on 23 February 2018. The broadcasting run of the third and last season ended on 3 July 2020.

Season 1

Season 2

Season 3

Awards and nominations 

|-
| align = "center" | 2018 || 6th  || colspan = "2" | Best Comedy Series ||  || 
|-
| align = "center" | 2019 || 6th Feroz Awards || Best Leading Actress (TV) || Eva Ugarte ||  || 
|-
| align = "center" | 2020 || 7th Feroz Awards || Best Leading Actress (TV) || Eva Ugarte ||  || 
|-
| align = "center" | 2021 || 8th Feroz Awards || colspan = "2" | Best Comedy Series ||  || 
|}

References 

Movistar+ network series
2018 Spanish television series debuts
2020 Spanish television series endings
2010s Spanish comedy television series
2020s Spanish comedy television series
Spanish-language television shows
Television shows filmed in Spain